The Laguna del Hunco Formation or Laguna del Hunco Tuff is a localized Early Eocene (Itaboraian in the SALMA classification) fossiliferous geological formation of the Cañadón Asfalto Basin in central Patagonia, Argentina.

The formation has been precisely dated to 52.22 ± 0.22 Ma on the basis of sanidine crystals in the tuffs of the formation. The Laguna del Hunco formation overlies the Barda Colorada Ignimbrite and is covered by the Sarmiento Group. The unit is renowned for the preservation of an extraordinarily rich fossil flora assemblage of mixed South American families and presently uniquely Australasian flora, among which the oldest Eucalyptus fossils found worldwide. The formation also has provided many fossil insects, including insect eggs, fossil fish of Bachmannia chubutensis and the frog Shelania pascuali. Periodic bursts of gas in the volcanic crater lake are thought to have produced the sudden death and preservation of the floral and faunal assemblage.

Description 
The Laguna del Hunco Formation, named after Laguna del Hunco ("Lake of Reeds"), a desert pond in Chubut Province, is a localized sedimentary unit comprising tuffaceous sandstones and mudstones with primary and reworked ashfall layers. The formation was deposited in a crater lake environment. This complex comprises a variety of volcaniclastic, intrusive, pyroclastic, and extrusive rocks, deposited over several million years. The complex is characterized by a great variety of volcanogenic bodies, such as ignimbrites, domes, lava flows, necks, intrusives, tuffs, and volcaniclastic deposits (of predominantly lacustrine origin), all of them frequently interbedded.

The Laguna del Hunco Formation was formerly included in the Huitrera Formation, overlies the Barda Colorada Ignimbrite, and is overlain by the Sarmiento Group. The formation has been dated using 40Ar/39Ar analysis on sanidine crystals of the ash beds to 52.22 ± 0.22 Ma, placing the deposits in the Early Eocene, or Itaboraian in the SALMA classification.

Paleontological significance 

The paleoflora of the formation is considered one of the most biodiverse Cenozoic fossil deposits worldwide. The biota is composed of extraordinarily rich assemblages of ferns, conifers, and flowering plants, many of which have not yet been formally described. The flora of the formation, studied since the 1920s, was formerly thought to be Miocene in age.

Three described species in the genus Gymnostoma of the family Casuarinaceae, and the species Ceratopetalum edgardoromeroi of the family Cunoniaceae are the only members of these families found outside of Australasia. Periodic gas bursts in the crater lake of Laguna del Hunco probably led to the sudden deaths of the flora and fauna found in the formation.

Eocene bird distribution 
the present distribution of Coraciiformes sensu lato in the world seems to be explained by the deterioration of warm climates at middle and high latitudes after the early Eocene climatic optimum, resulting in their extant pantropical distribution (e.g., Ref.8). The rich fossil plant assemblage at the Laguna del Hunco locality represents the environmental conditions in Patagonia during the early Eocene climatic optimum. Recent paleoenvironmental and floristic comparisons indicate that the closest modern analogs for the Laguna del Hunco flora are the Malesian lower-montane tropical, everwet rainforests15, where diverse extant “Coraciiformes” exist today. The Laguna del Hunco paleoenvironment resembles that reported for Holarctic stem-Coracii, such as Primobucconidae7–9 in being a frost-free, warm lakeshore environment, although they differ in their seasonality (seasonally dry vs. everwet). In fact, the age of the Laguna del Hunco biota, ca. 52.2 Ma13–15,19, is very similar to that of the Fossil Butte Member of the Green River Formation (51.66 ± 0.09 Ma), the source of Primobucco mcgrewi7,38.

Although Ueekenkcoracias is not the oldest stem-Coracii, due to the age of Septencoracias at ca. 54 Ma, the new taxon presented here provides important data for understanding the early biogeographic history of Coracii during the early Eocene. According to Claramunt and Cracraft34, modern ornithofaunas are the result of recurrent dispersal events using two main routes: one connecting South America with the Old World via North America and another one connecting South America with Australia and New Zealand through Antarctica. Those authors34 postulated that “Coraciiformes” (i.e., Coracii + Alcediniformes) colonized the Paleotropics from North American ancestors.

Given the presence of many of these lineages in the early Paleogene of Europe, they inferred that Coraciiformes reached the western Palearctic through a North Atlantic corridor before ~ 52 Ma. Although the ‘North American Gateway’ hypothesis explains well the origins of Musophagiformes30 and Coliiformes29, it does not explain the
current fossil record of Coracii, due to the presence of Ueekenkcoracias as the basalmost stem-Coracii in the early Eocene of South America. The arrival of a stem-Coracii lineage to South America may have occurred from North America if this clade has the biogeographic origin postulated by Ref.34, which would also open a second possible dispersal route from

North America to Africa (in addition to the European route34). Alternatively, the stem-Coracii may have arrived in South America from Africa if the latter continent is the biogeographic origin.

Fossil content 
 2021
 Subclass - Neognathae Pycraft, 1900
 Clade - Coracii Wetmore and Miller, 1926
 Ueekenkcoracias tambussiae 2021
 The generic name is from the native Tehuelche word ueekenk, meaning "outsider" in relation to its unexpected presence in South America, and the genus name Coracias. The species name honors Claudia Patricia Tambussi, whose contributions to paleornithology in the last three decades have fostered our understanding of the diversity and evolution of fossil birds in South America.

Holotype. MPEF-PV 10991, incomplete right hind limb, preserved in two slabs as part and counterpart.

The following fossils have been described from the formation:

See also 

 South American land mammal ages
 Itaboraí Formation, contemporaneous fossiliferous formation of Brazil
 Abanico Formation, contemporaneous fossiliferous formation of eastern Chile
 Bogotá Formation, contemporaneous fossil flora-bearing formation of central Colombia
 North American land mammal ages
 Nanjemoy Formation, contemporaneous fossiliferous formation of Maryland and Virginia
 Wasatch Formation, contemporaneous fossiliferous formation of the central-western United States
 European land mammal ages
 Messel pit, Eocene crater lake Lagerstätte of Germany
 Cañadón Asfalto Basin
 Collón Curá Formation, Miocene fossiliferous formation of the Cañadón Asfalto Basin

References

Bibliography 

     Material was copied from this source, which is available under a Creative Commons Attribution 4.0 International License.
 
 
 
   
   
 
 
 
 
 
   
 

 
 
 
 
 
 
 
 
 
 

Geologic formations of Argentina
Itaboraian
Ypresian Stage
Eocene Series of South America
Paleogene Argentina
Tuff formations
Mudstone formations
Sandstone formations
Lacustrine deposits
Ooliferous formations
Fossiliferous stratigraphic units of South America
Paleontology in Argentina
Formations
Geology of Chubut Province
Geology of Patagonia